Juni Kola (also Romanized as Jūnī Kolā; also known as Jūneh Kolā) is a village in Ahlamerestaq-e Jonubi Rural District, in the Central District of Mahmudabad County, Mazandaran Province, Iran. At the 2006 census, its population was 582, in 153 families.

References 

Populated places in Mahmudabad County